Mirabel was a former regional county municipality whose territory coincided with the city of Mirabel, Quebec.  It was established in 1985, whereas the city itself had been constituted in 1971.

It ceased to exist by January 1, 2002, in the midst of the early 2000s municipal reorganization in Quebec.  Although the city of Mirabel itself was unaffected, legislation gave newly constituted cities arising from that municipal reorganization the powers of a regional county municipality for the purpose of certain laws, and Mirabel got similar powers.  Today, Mirabel is not part of any regional county municipality; for statistical and census purposes, it is considered a territory equivalent to a regional county municipality.

See also
 Municipal history of Quebec

References

Former regional county municipalities in Quebec
Mirabel, Quebec
Populated places disestablished in 2002